Lake Monoun is a crater lake (maar) in West Province, Cameroon, that lies in the Oku Volcanic Field. On August 15, 1984, a limnic eruption occurred at the lake, which resulted in the release of a large amount of carbon dioxide that killed 37 people. At first, the deaths remained unexplained, and causes such as terrorism were suspected. Further investigation and a similar event two years later at Lake Nyos led to the currently accepted explanation.

Disaster

Several people reported hearing a loud noise on August 15, 1984, around 22:30. A gas cloud reportedly emanated from a crater in the eastern part of the lake. The resulting deaths of residents in a low-lying area are believed to have occurred between 03:00 and dawn. The victims were said to have skin burns, which reports later clarified as "skin damage" such as discoloration. Survivors reported that the whitish, smoke-like cloud smelled bitter and acidic. Vegetation was flattened around the eastern part of the lake, probably by a large wave of up to  height.

Although Lake Monoun is near the center of a volcanic field that includes at least 34 recent craters, the subsequent investigation found that the event was not caused by an eruption or sudden ejection of volcanic gas from the lake. Rather, emission of carbon dioxide in a limnic eruption is thought to be to blame. The cloud's smell and skin damage to victims were not fully explained. Some theories attribute the skin problems to a combination of preexisting conditions and routine postmortem effects like livor mortis, another medical interpretation says the body's metabolic rate was reduced inducing a severely restricted circulation in capillary vessels of the skin, resulting in necrosis, although there is no clear consensus.

Among the victims were some of the riders in a truck carrying twelve people. The truck's engine stopped working as it became starved of oxygen, and the people inside the truck got out and were killed. Two people sitting on top of the truck survived, because their elevated position allowed them to breathe – carbon dioxide is heavier than air (oxygen and nitrogen) which causes it to stay close to the ground.

Along with Lake Nyos and Lake Kivu, Lake Monoun is one of three lakes in the world known to have high concentrations of gas dissolved deep below the surface and which have the right conditions for a limnic eruption.

Degassing
In March and April 1992 preliminary test were conducted at Lake Monoun using the gas lift method as known in the petroleum industry. Initially a pump (or preferably a compressed gas injection) is needed to pull water from the bottom, but as carbon dioxide begins to come out of solution it creates buoyancy in the water in the pipes, allowing a self-sustaining process without the need for external energy supply.

Due to the very limited funds for the project and construction basically by hand, the solution was the use of high-density polyethylene (HDPE) pipes. The material has a specific gravity of 0.96 kg/L which means an almost neutral buoyancy in water. The HDPE plastic is flexible, not brittle, and resistive to chemical and weathering alteration as proven material for natural gas distribution networks.
The pipe could be easily solded electrically in the field from standard  segments, and deployed with just the help of a few rubber boats plus floats. With some ballast, the pipe hangs freely from an anchored raft like a pendulum.
Unfortunately, the -rich, oxygen-depleted water from the depth is a challenge for steel fittings: Corrosion occurred and formed siderite which removed iron from the steel.

In February 2003, a venting pipe was inserted into the lake, in an effort to prevent the disaster from recurring. In the initial degassing phase, an  fountain developed from the water tapped at  depth. However, a study found in 2005 that gas was not being removed from the lake quickly enough to ensure that the disaster could never happen again. On the other hand, the deep lake water is rich in iron(II) ions, which after a while transforms into limonite. As the lake is a fishing ground for local villagers, the effect of a higher iron intake rate in the upper water layer on fishlife needed consideration before scaling up the degassing rate.

In December 2013, the degassing pipe  was upgraded with a small solar-power driven rotary pump, since it had lost its self-lift capability due to the bubbling effect in the riser as a significant amount of  had been removed from the bottom layers. The new system is able to lift  of bottom water to the surface per day.

See also

Mazuku
Meromictic lake
Lake Kivu
Limnic eruption

References

External links
The Lake Nyos and Monoun Degassing Project
Killer lakes in Cameroon may strike again
Volcanic Lakes and Gas Releases – Reports from the investigation of the disaster
BBC News 27 Sep 2005: Action needed on deadly lakes
 Mechanics of the switching on of the trigger mechanism of limnological catastrophes – Latvian research by Nataliya Anatolievna Solodovnik and Anatoliy Borisovich Solodovnik

Lakes of Cameroon
West Region (Cameroon)
20th-century volcanic events
Mbéré Rift Valley
Rift volcanoes
Volcanoes of Cameroon
Maars of Cameroon
Gas explosions
Volcanic crater lakes
Meromictic lakes
Explosions in Cameroon
Explosions in 1984
August 1984 events in Africa
1984 in Cameroon
Natural disasters in Cameroon
Limnically active lakes